Preparation for the Next Life is a 2014 work of fiction by American author Atticus Lish. It won the 2015 PEN/Faulkner Award for Fiction, and the 2016 Grand Prix de Littérature Américaine.

References

2014 American novels
PEN/Faulkner Award for Fiction-winning works